Ingoglia is an Italian surname meaning "belonging to the family of Goglia". Notable people with the surname include:

Blaise Ingoglia (born 1970), American politician 
Rene Ingoglia (born 1972), American football player

References

Italian-language surnames